Gamma Alpha Omega  is a Latina-founded Greek letter intercollegiate sorority, established in 1993 on the campus of Arizona State University in Tempe, Arizona. The sorority has 28 collegiate chapters and 13 alumnae chapters.

History

Founders

From the beginning the organization was "dedicated to promoting the achievement and quest of higher education amongst all women", thus while established by Latinas it was open from the start to women of all backgrounds. Its mission is noted with four goals:
 increase the number of women with college educations and advanced degrees.
 provide mentors for youth, women and underrepresented communities,
 support individual leaders in each member
 provide lifelong support for sisters, rooted in the pillars of Honesty, Integrity, Leadership, Scholarship and Unity.

Milestones
In 1997, Gamma Alpha Omega expanded beyond Arizona with the founding of Gamma chapter at the University of Washington on January 24 of that year.

In 2000, the sorority became a founding member of the National Association of Latino Fraternal Organizations (NALFO) when it emerged as a national association of Latino fraternal groups.

April 2001, marked a milestone for Gamma Alpha Omega, when the organization was officially recognized as an incorporated entity in the state of Arizona.

In 2012, Gamma Alpha Omega chartered the first double letter chapter for the Sorority at the University of New Mexico.

In 2016, Gamma Alpha Omega withdrew from NALFO alongside several other founding fraternity and sorority members of the council. This was due to a variety of reasons.

Symbols and traditions
At its founding the sorority chose the colors Forest Green, Navy Blue and White as identifiers, along with a mascot of a "White Bengal Tiger with Blue Eyes". Further symbolism has been added over the years, including a flower, the "White Thornless Rose", and three jewels, the Green Emerald, Blue Sapphire and White Diamond. The official colors were refined with adoption of the sorority's branding guide.

The sorority notes five "pillars", important to its culture: honesty, integrity, leadership, scholarship and unity.

The sorority recognizes high-functioning chapters as "Diamond Standard" chapters.

The sorority publishes a digital magazine twice annually called The ROSE Vine.

Governance
Governance of the sorority is vested in a National Executive Board which manages the affairs of the organization on a day-to-day basis.  The sorority meets in a national convention every two years during odd-numbered years. Regional conferences are held in the off-years between national conventions.

National leadership
As of July 1, 2021, national officers include:
  National President
  Vice President
  VP of Expansion
  VP of Communications
  VP of Collegiate Affairs
  VP of Programming
  VP of Standards
  VP of Finance
  VP of Alumnae Affairs
In addition, the National Administration also contains regional and national directors that assist with the different regions, areas, and departments with the National Office & Headquarters of Gamma Alpha Omega.

Chapters
Active chapters noted in bold, inactive chapters noted in italics. Chapter information from the national website or the referenced Baird's Manual online archive.

See also
 National Association of Latino Fraternal Organizations
 List of social fraternities and sororities

References

1993 establishments in Arizona
National Association of Latino Fraternal Organizations
Hispanic and Latino American organizations
Arizona State University
Hispanic and Latino American culture in Arizona
Latino fraternities and sororities
Fraternities and sororities in the United States
Student organizations established in 1993